Zavarak may refer to:
 Zavarak, Amol, Mazandaran Province
 Zavarak, Babol, Mazandaran Province
 Zavarak, Qazvin